Semperian is an investment fund based in Jersey.  It holds investments in 92 Private finance initiative projects.

It was formerly part of Telereal Trillium. In 2010 it had £1.4bn of assets under management, and reported that its investors expect to make a 10% return a year.

It reported profits of £272 million in 2014/5.

In November 2015 it acquired MAMG Asset Management Group.

In January 2022 it had investments in 94 assets mostly in the UK, with government-backed and inflation-linked cash flow streams, including accommodation, hospital beds, car parking spaces, schools and road assets.

References

Companies of Jersey